Ribonuclease H1 also known as RNase H1 is an enzyme that in humans is encoded by the RNASEH1 gene. The RNase H1 is a non-specific endonuclease and catalyzes the cleavage of RNA via a hydrolytic mechanism.

References

Further reading

External links